The cinnamon-banded kingfisher (Todiramphus australasia) is a species of bird in the family Alcedinidae.
It is found in Indonesia and East Timor. It is endemic to the Lesser Sundas.
Its natural habitat is subtropical or tropical dry forests.
It is threatened by habitat loss.

References

cinnamon-banded kingfisher
Birds of the Lesser Sunda Islands
cinnamon-banded kingfisher
Taxa named by Louis Jean Pierre Vieillot
Taxonomy articles created by Polbot